Matthew Kennedy (born 6 March 1991) is a South African cricketer. He played in five first-class and six List A matches for Eastern Province between 2009 and 2011.

See also
 List of Eastern Province representative cricketers

References

External links
 

1991 births
Living people
South African cricketers
Eastern Province cricketers
Cricketers from Port Elizabeth